Herménégilde Duchaussoy (6 May 1854 – 17 April 1934) was a French meteorologist.

1854 births
1934 deaths
French meteorologists
People from Somme (department)